Nansunzhuang station is a station on Line 6 of Tianjin Metro in Tianjin, China, which opened in 2016.

References

Railway stations in Tianjin
Railway stations in China opened in 2016
Tianjin Metro stations